Iridaceae is a family of plants in order Asparagales, taking its name from the irises, meaning rainbow, referring to its many colours. There are 66 accepted genera with a total of c. 2244 species worldwide (Christenhusz & Byng 2016). It includes a number of other well known cultivated plants, such as freesias, gladioli and crocuses.

Members of this family are perennial plants, with a bulb, corm or rhizome.  The plants grow erect, and have leaves that are generally grass-like, with a sharp central fold. Some examples of members of this family are the blue flag and yellow flag.

Name and history
The family name is based on the genus Iris, the family's largest and best-known genus in Europe. This genus dates from 1753, when it was coined by Swedish botanist, Carl Linnaeus. Its name derives from the Greek goddess, Iris, who carried messages from Olympus to earth along a rainbow, whose colours were seen by Linnaeus in the multi-hued petals of many of the species.

The family is currently divided into four subfamilies but the results from DNA analysis suggest that several more should be recognised:

Subfamily Crocoideae is one of the major subfamilies in the family Iridaceae. It contains many genera, including Afrocrocus, Babiana, Chasmanthe, Crocosmia, Crocus, Cyanixia, Devia, Dierama, Duthiastrum, Freesia, Geissorhiza, Gladiolus, Hesperantha, Ixia, Lapeirousia, Melasphaerula, Micranthus, Pillansia, Romulea, Sparaxis, Savannosiphon, Syringodea, Thereianthus, Tritonia, Tritoniopsis, Xenoscapa and Watsonia.
They are mainly from Africa, but includes members from Europe and Asia. The rootstock is usually a corm, they have blooms which sometimes have scent are collected in inflorescence and contain six tepals. The nectar is produced mostly in the base of the bloom from the glands of the ovary, which is where the flower forms a tube-like end. In some species there is no such end and the plant only provides pollen to pollinating insects. Members of this subfamily have the sword-shaped leaves typical of Iridaceae.

Subfamily Isophysidoideae contains the single genus Isophysis, from Tasmania. It is the only member of the family with a superior ovary and has a star-like yellow to brownish flower.

Subfamily Nivenioideae contains six genera from South Africa, Australia and Madagascar, including the only true shrubs in the family (Klattia, Nivenia and Witsenia) as well as the only myco-heterotroph (Geosiris). Aristea is also a member of this subfamily. It is distinguished by having flowers in small, paired clusters among large bracts, slender styles that are divided into three slender branches and nectar (when present) produced from glands in the ovary walls. The flowers are always radially symmetrical, with separate tepals (petals) and the rootstock is a rhizome.

Subfamily Iridoideae is distributed throughout the range of the family and contains the large genera Iris and Moraea. It is the only subfamily that is represented in North and South America. The species have flowers in solitary clusters among large bracts, styles that are often petal-like or crested and nectar (when present) is produced from glands on the tepals. Most species have separate petals and the rootstock is usually a rhizome or rarely a bulb. The flowers are almost always radially symmetrical. Bobartia, Dietes and Ferraria belong to this subfamily.

Ecology
Members of Iridaceae occur in a great variety of habitats. About the only place they do not grow is in the sea itself, although Gladiolus gueinzii occurs on the seashore just above the high tide mark within reach of the spray. Most species are adapted to seasonal climates that have a pronounced dry or cold period unfavourable for plant growth and during which the plants dormant. As a result, most species are deciduous. Evergreen species are restricted to subtropical forests or savannah, temperate grasslands and perennially moist fynbos. A few species grow in marshes or along streams and some even grow only in the spray of seasonal waterfalls.

The above ground parts (leaves and stems) of deciduous species die down when the bulb or corm enters dormancy. The plants thus survive periods that are unfavourable for growth by retreating underground. This is particularly useful in grasslands and fynbos, which are adapted to regular burning in the dry season. At this time the plants are dormant and their bulbs or corms are able to survive the heat of the fires underground. Veld fires clear the soil surface of competing vegetation, as well as fertilise it with ash. With the arrival of the first rains, the dormant corms are ready to burst into growth, sending up flowers and stems before they can be shaded out by other vegetation. Many grassland and fynbos irids flower best after fires and some fynbos species will only flower in the season after a fire.

The family has a very diverse pollination ecology. Most species are pollinated by various species of solitary bees but many are adapted to pollination by sunbirds. These species typically have red to orange, trumpet-like flowers that secrete large amounts of nectar. Other species are adapted to pollination by butterflies and moths, carrion flies and long-proboscid flies, and even monkey-beetles.

List of genera
Up to 80 genera have been recognised in the family, with a total of around 1500 species, worldwide. The Afrotropical realm, and in particular South Africa, have the greatest diversity of genera. The spice saffron comes from the stigma of the saffron crocus, Crocus sativus.

References

Bibliography 

 
 
 
 
 

Subdivision

External links

 
Asparagales families
Selandian first appearances
Extant Selandian first appearances